The White Stripes were an American rock band from Detroit, Michigan.  The following is a complete list of songs recorded by the band.

Album songs
All songs that appear on albums by The White Stripes. (87 songs)

Bonus tracks 
Songs that do not appear on the studio albums. Includes both non-album singles and B-Sides.

Live recordings
Any song that has not been studio recorded by The White Stripes, but officially released.

Remixes
List of remixes and alternate versions of songs.

Notes 

White Stripes